Gadegaard is a Danish surname. Notable people with the surname include: 

Anne Gadegaard (born 1991), Danish singer-songwriter
Paul Gadegaard (1920–1992), Danish painter and sculptor
Sofia Gadegaard Shah (born 1997), Nepalese swimmer

Danish-language surnames